K. P. Sudheera is a Malayalam language writer from Kerala, India. She has published 80 works in various genres, including novels, poetry, travelogues, biographies, memoirs, translations, letters, and children's literature. Many of her works have been translated to Hindi, Telugu, Tamil and Kannada languages.

Biography
K. P. Sudheera was born on 1958, in Puthiyara, Kozhikode, the daughter of K. C. Padmanabhan and Sarada. After studying in BEM Girls' High School, Kozhikode, she received her Bachelor's Degree in Zoology from Govt. Arts & Science College and Providence College. She is currently the manager of North Malabar Gramin Bank, Regional Division, Kozhikode. She and her husband T. M. Raghunath (Retd. Superintendent, Provident Fund Office, Kozhikode) have two children, Amit and Atul. They live in their house Visranthi in Kozhikode.

Sudheera, who started writing at a young age, won a prize in an all-Kerala story competition while studying in college. Later, after joining in Gramin Bank, she became more active in writing. Renowned writer and literary critic M. Krishnan Nair wrote a very good comment about a story of her published at that time, that was her inspiration to write more. She has published 80 books in various genres, including novels, poetry, travelogues, biographies, memoirs, translations, letters, and children's literature. Many of her works have been translated to Hindi, Telugu, Tamil and Kannada languages.

Prabhakaran Hebbar Illam received the award Balakrishna Goenka Anoodith Sahitya Puraskaram for his Hindi translation of K. P. Sudheera's Ganga.

Selected works

Short story collections
 
 
 
 
 
 
 
 
 
 
 
 
 
 
Atheetham
Sahayathrika

Novels

Children's literature
 
 
 
 
 
 
Jeevanakala

Biography
. Based on life of S. P. Balasubrahmanyam.

Poetry collection

Memoirs

translations
 . Adaptation of Meghadūta by Kalidasa.

Travelogues

Article collection
 Snehathinte Mukhangal

Awards

International level awards
 Dubai Art Lovers Association Award
 Jeddah Arangu Award
 Lingual Harmony Award, London
 Daughter of Nile, Egypt
 Woman of the Era Award, Tashkent
 Lady of the Time Award, Dubai
 Daughter of Himalaya Award, Nepal
 Sangamitra of the Age Award, Sri Lanka
 Minarva of East Award, Saint Petersburg

National level awards and awards from other states
 2015: Akka Maha Devi literary Award
 Delhi Sahithya Academy Award
 Bijapur Taj Muglini Award
 Gayathri Award
 Mirabai Award (Delhi)
 Kasthurba Samman
 Sriman Aravind Ashram Award (Assam)

State level and other awards
 Kamala Surayya Award by Kerala government
 Lalithambika Antharjanam Award for young writers
 Mathrubhumi Grihalakshmi Award for Best Short Story (twice)
 Kesari Balakrishna Pillai Award
 Uroob Award
 Aksharam Vaikom Muhammad Basheer Award
 Arangu Award
 Anveshi's Literary Award
 Kodamana Award
 Manaseva Puraskaram instituted in the name of Chatampi Swamikal
 Dharmeekatha – Excellency Award
 Kala Kairali Award
 Thakazhi Award
 Literary competition organized by OV Vijayan Memorial Committee on the occasion of the Golden Jubilee of Khasakkinte Itihasam, third prize in poetry.

References

1958 births
Living people
Malayalam-language writers
Indian women poets
Indian children's writers
Malayali people
Malayalam poets
21st-century Indian poets
21st-century Indian women writers
Women writers from Kerala
Translators to Malayalam
21st-century Indian translators
Indian women translators
Malayalam short story writers
Malayalam novelists
Indian women novelists
Indian women short story writers
People from Kozhikode district